The Knights Abisai, Sibbechai and Benaja Bring King David Water are a pair of side panels from a large polyptych altarpiece painted  by the German-born artist Konrad Witz. They are now in the collection of the Kunstmuseum Basel in Basel, Switzerland.

Background 
The two panels were originally the left and right panels in the lower row on the inside of the right wing of the Salvation Mirror altar in St Leonard's collegiate church in Basel. They are considered to be amongst the artist's best work. A Salvation Mirror altar was so called because it depicted scenes from the Speculum Humanae Salvationis (or Mirror of Human Salvation), an illustrated book of popular theology written in Latin in the Middle Ages. The St. Leonards altar was later dismantled and much of it lost.

Description 
The pictures jointly portray a scene from a story in the Old Testament (2 Samuel 23:13-17). During a war with the Philistines, who were encamped at Bethlehem, King David, during a meeting with his chief warriors had exclaimed, “Oh, that someone would get me a drink of water from the well near the gate of Bethlehem!". Three of his best warriors (Abisai, Sibbechai and Benaja) stole through the Philistine positions, drew water from the well and carried it back to the king. David, however, would not drink it, pouring it instead on the ground as an offering to God with the words “Far be it from me, Lord, to drink this! Is it not the blood of men who went at the risk of their lives?”

See also

 100 Great Paintings

References

External links
 2 Samuel 23

1435 paintings
Paintings by Konrad Witz
Paintings depicting Hebrew Bible people
Altarpieces